Derwent Park is a residential locality in the local government area (LGA) of Glenorchy in the Hobart LGA region of Tasmania. The 2016 census recorded a population of 657 for the state suburb of Derwent Park.
It is a suburb of Hobart.

It is predominantly a light commercial and industrial area.

History 
Derwent Park was gazetted as a locality in 1961. The name is derived from a property established in the area about 1820.

Geography
The waters of the River Derwent and Prince of Wales Bay form the northern boundary.

Road infrastructure 
National Route 1 (Brooker Highway) runs through from north-west to south-east.

References

Towns in Tasmania
Localities of City of Glenorchy